Paul Nitz is a paralympic athlete from the United States competing mainly in category T52 sprint events.

Biography
Paul has competed in five paralympics winning four paralympic gold and one Bronze Medals. His first games came in 1992 where he was part of the American TW1-2 4 × 100 m relay team that set a new world record on the way to winning the gold medal and won the individual 100m in a new paralympic record as well as competing in the 200m and 400m. In his home games in 1996 he again competed in the 100m, 200m and 400m setting a new world record in the 100m to win his second gold medal at the distance. A third 100m gold came in 2000 Summer Paralympics where he also finished sixth in the 200m. His fourth games in 2004 Summer Paralympics were the first time Paul had been beaten in a Paralympic 100m final where he could only manage sixth, he also failed to make the final in both the 200m and 400m.

After missing out on making the 2008 Beijing Paralympics, Paul came back in 2012 with sights on more medals and records. At the Swiss Championships in May 2012, he broke the World Record twice in two separate competitions. His best time was 16.73 seconds. He finished the 2012 season, on the podium, with the Bronze medal around his neck.

References

External links 
 
 

Paralympic track and field athletes of the United States
Athletes (track and field) at the 1992 Summer Paralympics
Athletes (track and field) at the 1996 Summer Paralympics
Athletes (track and field) at the 2000 Summer Paralympics
Athletes (track and field) at the 2004 Summer Paralympics
Paralympic gold medalists for the United States
Living people
World record holders in Paralympic athletics
Medalists at the 1992 Summer Paralympics
Medalists at the 1996 Summer Paralympics
Medalists at the 2000 Summer Paralympics
Medalists at the 2012 Summer Paralympics
Athletes (track and field) at the 2012 Summer Paralympics
Year of birth missing (living people)
Paralympic medalists in athletics (track and field)
Medalists at the 2015 Parapan American Games
American male wheelchair racers